This is a list of FM radio stations in the United States having call signs beginning with the letters WT through WV. Low-power FM radio stations, those with designations such as WTCS-LP, have not been included in this list.

WT

WU

WV

See also
 North American call sign

Lists of radio stations in the United States